The Double Concerto for Violin, Piano, and Strings is a composition by the Danish composer Hans Abrahamsen.  The work was commissioned by the Royal Danish Orchestra and the Swedish Chamber Orchestra and was composed between 2010 and 2011.  Its world premiere was given by the sister duo of the violinist Baiba Skride and the pianist Lauma Skride with the Royal Danish Orchestra under the direction of André de Ridder in [Copenhagen on October 9, 2011.  The piece is dedicated to Baiba & Lauma Skride, Wiebke Busch, and André de Ridder.

Composition

Structure
The concerto has a duration of roughly 22 minutes and is composed in four movements:
Sehr langsahm und ausdrucksvoll
Schnell und unruhig
Langsam und melancholisch
Lebhaft und zittern

Instrumentation
The work is scored for an ensemble consisting of violin, piano, and strings (violins I & II, violas, violoncellos, and double basses).

Reception
The Double Concerto has been praised by music critics.  Andrew Clements of The Guardian described the piece as "equally parsimonious with its material, sometimes reducing it to a single line or simple gestures."  Despite this light criticism, he nevertheless added, "But in its quietly beautiful, introspective way it touches on a whole range of musical worlds, from late Brahms to Arvo Pärt."  Also writing for The Guadian, the music critic Kate Molleson remarked, "Abrahamsen's recent language is less urgently polemical, more suggestive, and here he uses the orchestra to paint wide, subtle landscapes on to which the soloists place delicate but definite sound objects. The piece spirits away – a classic Abrahamsen move leaving us in lingering mystery."  In an article for The Herald, Molleson further wrote:

References

Compositions by Hans Abrahamsen
2011 compositions
Compositions for string orchestra
Concertos for multiple instruments